Limnobacter litoralis is a Gram-negative, oxidase- and catalase-positive, non-spore-forming, thiosulfate-oxidizing, anaerobic bacterium of the genus Limnobacter and family Burkholderiaceae, isolated from a 22-year-old volcanic deposit on the island of Miyake-jima in Japan.

References

External links
Type strain of Limnobacter litoralis at BacDive -  the Bacterial Diversity Metadatabase

Burkholderiaceae